Legok is a district located in the Tangerang Regency of Banten Province on Java, Indonesia. It covers an area of 35.13 km2 and had a population of 98,171 at the 2010 Census and 118,391 at the 2020 Census.

References

Tangerang Regency
Districts of Banten
Populated places in Banten